Ella Jansen (born September 1, 2005) is a Canadian competitive swimmer specializing in freestyle, butterfly and individual medley events.

Career
A native of Burlington, Ontario, Jansen trained at the Etobicoke Swimming club and attended Notre Dame Catholic Secondary School. She competed at the swimming trials for the Canadian team for the 2020 Summer Olympics in Tokyo, with her highest finish being fourth in both the 1500 metre freestyle and the 200 metre butterfly, in the latter breaking the Ontario age group record previously set by Penny Oleksiak. She did not qualify for the Olympic team, noting afterward that it was "not quite how I wanted it to go but each day it got a little better and overall, it was an amazing experience."

Jansen recorded notable results domestically in 2022, winning bronze medals at the Canadian national trials in the 200 metre butterfly, 400 metre freestyle, and 400 metre individual medley. While she did not qualify for the World team, she was named to the Canadian team for the 2022 Commonwealth Games in Birmingham, as well as for the Junior Pan Pacific Swimming Championships in Honolulu. She and teammate Katrina Bellio then lead Etobicoke Swimming club to victory at the Eastern Canadian Championships. Competing in Birmingham, she made her first major international final, coming fifth in the 400 m individual medley with a time of 4:40.17. Assessing the result afterward, Jansen said "the goal today was just to make the final. I wanted the time to be under 4:40 so there’s still a lot of room to improve." Jansen swam for the Canadian team in the heats of the 4×100 m mixed freestyle relay, helping them qualify to the final. She was replaced by Rebecca Smith in the final, but shared in the team's bronze medal win. She later was part of the finals team in the 4×200 m freestyle relay, swimming the second leg and winning a silver medal. This was Jansen's first major international podium, of which she said she "didn't expect it going into the meet. It was all so amazing to swim with the girls and get the medal." She also reached the final of the 400 m freestyle and placed seventh with a time of 4:10.69, stating that she had come up just short of her goal of going under the 4 minute and 10 second mark.

References

External links 
 
 

2005 births
Living people
Sportspeople from Burlington, Ontario
Swimmers at the 2022 Commonwealth Games
Commonwealth Games medallists in swimming
Commonwealth Games silver medallists for Canada
Commonwealth Games bronze medallists for Canada
Canadian female freestyle swimmers
Canadian female butterfly swimmers
Canadian female medley swimmers
21st-century Canadian women
Medallists at the 2022 Commonwealth Games